North-American Spanish is the name of the Spanish dialects spoken in North America, and includes:

 Caribbean Spanish
Central American Spanish
 List of colloquial expressions in Honduras
Mexican Spanish
 American Spanish
Isleño Spanish
New Mexican Spanish
Puerto Rican Spanish

Spanish dialects of North America